Makineh-ye Bahrani (also Romanized as Makīneh-ye Baḥrānī) is a village in Seyyed Abbas Rural District, Shavur District, Shush County, Khuzestan Province, Iran. At the 2006 census, its population was 61, in 8 families.

References 

Populated places in Shush County